Highams Park is a suburban district in the London Borough of Waltham Forest, England, near Epping Forest and 8.1 miles (13 km) north-east of Charing Cross.

Traditionally a part of Walthamstow parish and municipal borough, it is primarily a residential area, with mainly Victorian and 1930s terraced houses.

Hale End
The whole of the Highams Park area was once known as Hale End, as evidenced by the name of Hale End Library, and the Halex factory.

Although postcode areas are not intended to define districts, it might be said that Hale End approximates to the part of Highams Park which shares the postal district of IG8 with Woodford Green. The rest of Highams Park, which takes the Chingford postal district, E4. The park from which the area is (partially) named is located within the IG8 postcode area.

Education

Schools

Primary schools
Handsworth Primary School
Selwyn Primary School (Previously Infants and Juniors).
There are also three other primary schools, Ainslie Wood Primary School (South Chingford), Oak Hill Primary School (Hale End) and Thorpe Hall School (Walthamstow) which are close to Highams Park.

Secondary schools
Highams Park School (formerly known as Sydney Burnell School).  The school has pupils aged 11–16, and also has a sixth form college for pupils aged 16–18. The school holds dual specialist status as a Technology College and a Sports College.

Special schools
Joseph Clark School for partially sighted and blind pupils which is a combined primary and secondary school.

Library
Hale End Library is in Highams Park and is positioned on The Avenue and was refurbished between January and July 2007.

Sports and recreation
There are two main sports grounds in Highams Park, Jubilee Sports Ground (formally Truman's Sports Ground) and Rolls Park. Jubilee is positioned off The Avenue. It is now owned by Waltham Forest Council. It is mainly used for football, with local teams and youth teams training and playing on the field and astro-turf. The ground is not open to the public. Rolls Park is slightly bigger and is open to the public. The field is used mainly for football and cricket. There is also a tennis club and a small gym at the edges of the field. There is also a bar/clubroom owned by West Essex football and cricket clubs.

There is another Tennis club (Whitehalls) situated on Larkshall Road. Highams Park Lake is used for Kayaking by members of The Scout Association.

"The Highams Park" and Highams Park Lake

The park is known officially as "The Highams Park" but is often known locally as "Highams Park Field", "The Field", "The Park" or "The lake". Most of the park is on a hill with a gradual rise to the north end. It is frequented by dog walkers, runners and families. The park has a cafe and a playground.

Highams Park Lake is to the west of the park, and is owned by the City of London Corporation although the rest of the park is maintained by the London Borough of Waltham Forest. The lake was formed by the landscape gardener Humphry Repton who created it by damming the River Ching. The lake, adjoining park and the Manor House (now Woodford County High School) were known as Highams Bensted. The last owner, Sir Thomas Courtenay Warner, built both the Warner Estate in Walthamstow and the Highams Estate; the latter bounds the park to the North and East. The lake itself is about 450m long and about 80m wide at the widest point. At the south end of the lake is a boat house built by Kenneth Robert John Ford and owned by Waltham Forest South Scouts. The north end of the lake is much narrower and shallower, and it often dries out into mud in the summer. The River Ching flows past the lake but does not actually flow into it; a small outflow at the south end of the lake flows into the river.

There is a small island in the lake which is inhabited by nesting swans. Near the top of the lake are some large rocks thought to have been placed there by Humphry Repton to improve the lake's appearance. A public toilet block used to be situated on the east side of the lake although it was demolished many years ago, and only the foundations remain.

Halex and Tesco
The Halex factory was situated on Larkshall Road and was a major local employer from 1897 to 1971.  The factory was established by the British Xylonite Company to produce a variety of goods mostly from plastic. The Halex company had a virtual monopoly on manufacturing table tennis balls.  The factory closed in the early 1970s and has since been knocked down and replaced by new smaller factories and industrial buildings.  A blue plaque on Jubilee Avenue marks the spot where the building stood; it reads "Plastics Historical Society.  On this site, from 1897–1971, stood the Halex factory of the British Xylonite Company."

Some of the land in this area is now owned by supermarket chain Tesco, which was initially refused permission to build a store on the site in June 2007 by then Local Government Secretary Ruth Kelly after a protracted process of planning applications dating back to early 2005. The reasons cited for the refusal involved the size of the proposed store and the building not being in keeping with local Victorian and Edwardian buildings. However, in 2009 a revised planning application was passed despite the efforts of some local residents to stop this from happening.

A recent campaign seeks to honour the men of Highams Park who worked in the Halex Factory and gave their lives in both world wars. The campaigners also wish to see the return of the local war memorial to its original site.

Railway
Highams Park station is on the London Overground Chingford branch which runs from London Liverpool Street to Chingford, The line is one of the Lea Valley lines. The railway line cuts through the area with a level crossing, close to the station, this being the only place actually in Highams Park where vehicles can cross the track. The level crossing itself, until 2002, was controlled by a signalman who worked in the traditional signal box next to the crossing. However, in 2002, despite local opposition, the gates began to be operated from a central office at Liverpool Street station. The signal box was marked for demolition, but due to the efforts of "The Highams Park Forum" (a group of local residents), and local Member of Parliament (and then leader of the Conservative Party) Iain Duncan Smith, the box was saved with the intention of turning it into a museum or a tea room. In 2017 the signal box was reopened as a crêperie called LaBoite.

Buses 
Highams Park is served by London Buses routes 212, 275, W16 and school route 675.

Notable residents
Fred Pontin, founder of the holiday parks company Pontins, was born in Highams Park in 1906. He lived on Forest Glade and attended Sir George Monoux Grammar School in Walthamstow.
 Trevor Bailey, Essex and England cricketer.
 Graham Barnfield, pundit and academic, moved to Highams Park in 2001. 
 John Berger, socialist artist and writer, lived in Highams Park as a child.
 Blazin' Squad (band): Members of the band Blazin' Squad lived in or near Highams Park and studied at Highams Park School. 
 Johnny Dankworth, musician and soloist, born in Highams Park in 1927.
 Sir George Edwards, aircraft designer and industrialist, born in Hale End Road, Highams Park, on 9 July 1908.
 Chris Moncrieff, political journalist.
 Tara Moran, actress.
 Teddy Sheringham, footballer, born on 2 April 1966 in Highams Park.
 John Smith, filmmaker, born in Highams Park and attended Selwyn Avenue School and George Monoux School.
 John Maxwell Hutchinson, English architect, BBC broadcaster, and Anglican deacon, former President of the Royal Institute of British Architects.

Nearby places
Chingford
Walthamstow
Woodford Green
Leytonstone

References

External links
 Images of Highams Park at the English Heritage Archive

Areas of London
Districts of the London Borough of Waltham Forest
District centres of London